Senna socotrana is a species of flowering plant in the family Fabaceae, that is endemic to Yemen.

References

socotrana
Endemic flora of Socotra
Least concern plants
Taxonomy articles created by Polbot